Tricholomopsis rutilans, known by the unusual but apt common name of Plums and Custard or, less commonly Red-haired agaric, is a species of gilled mushroom found across Europe and North America.

Description

A striking and easily recognised fungus, Plums and Custard takes its common name from its plum-red scaled cap and crowded custard yellow gills. The flesh is cream-coloured and spore print creamy white. The base colour of the cap under the purplish scales is yellow. 

Cap: convex becoming bell-shaped then flattening with age. 1-5" wide with an incurved margin, densely covered with red to purplish red or brick red hairs with maturity the hairs bunching into small scales and the yellowish color beneath showing through

Gills: Broadly Attached To The Stem, yellow, and crowded with many short gills

Stem: 2-4 inches tall, 7/16" to ⅝" thick with a red scaly base fading to yellow towards the gills

Spores: cream colored, 3–5 x 2.5–5 µm; almost globe shaped to broadly ellipsoid; smooth; clear like glass in KOH

Habitat: Saprobic on the well-decayed wood of conifers, also occasionally reported in woodchips, sawdust, and lignin-rich soil.  Growing alone, scattered or gregariously, widely distributed in North America. 

Microscopic features: basidia with 4 protrusions, cheilocystidia 50-70+ x 20-25 µm; shaped like a ball on a stick to sack shaped or swollen-irregular, smooth, thin-walled, clear in KOH.  Pleurocystidia scattered, 30-35 x 5-7 µm, flask shaped to almost cylindrical, smooth, clear in KOH.

KOH: red on cap surface

Distribution and habitat
Tricholomopsis rutilans can be found growing on tree stumps and logs (especially those of spruce) in coniferous woodlands throughout the northern hemisphere, in places as diverse as Ireland, Bulgaria, Ukraine and North-West Russia, in late summer and autumn (June until November). It has also been found, probably accidentally introduced, in Australia and Costa Rica on introduced pine trees.

Edibility

Many older texts list T. rutilans as apparently able to be eaten after boiling, though not recommended. A couple of more recent books list it as of poor quality, reportedly due to a taste of rotting wood.

Similar species
A related species, Tricholomopsis decora, is also found in conifer woods but is golden in colour, much less common and found at higher altitudes. Megacollybia fallax is similar but with a gray-brown cap.

References

Further reading

 Fuhrer B. (2005) A Field Guide to Australian Fungi. Bloomings Books.

External links

Mykoweb page on T. rutilans

rutilans
Fungi of Europe
Taxa named by Jacob Christian Schäffer
Fungi of North America